Greg Hardie (born 23 May 1945) is a former Australian rules footballer who played with Carlton in the Victorian Football League (VFL).

Notes

External links 

Greg Hardie's profile at Blueseum

1945 births
Carlton Football Club players
Australian rules footballers from Victoria (Australia)
Living people